The European Journal of Remote Sensing (EuJRS) is an academic journal about remote sensing published by Taylor & Francis on behalf of the Associazione Italiana di Telerilevamento (Italian Association of Remote Sensing) and co-sponsored by the European Association of Remote Sensing Laboratories (EARSeL).
Its editor-in-chief is Marco Marchetti;
its 2018 impact factor is 1.904.

References

Remote sensing journals
Taylor & Francis academic journals